The Mother and Child Scheme was a healthcare programme in Ireland that would later become remembered as a major political crisis involving primarily the Irish Government and Roman Catholic Church in the early 1950s.

The scheme was referred to as the Mother and Child Service in legislation. A brochure, "What the new service means to every family", was prepared. It explained the new service but was not issued to the public. The scheme was engulfed in crisis before this could happen.

Background
Since the establishment of the Irish Free State in 1922 responsibility in the government for healthcare had lain with the Minister for Local Government and Public Health. No significant reform of healthcare occurred in this time and the Catholic Church still retained effective control through the ownership of hospitals and schools, while family doctors still largely practised in isolation of other medical professionals.

The Fianna Fáil TD Seán MacEntee started the process of reform as Minister for Local Government & Public Health in 1943. After the Second World War there was renewed optimism after the depression of the preceding decades. Once the Emergency was over the political agenda started to shift from Irish Civil War politics, which had dominated politics, to the domestic agenda and social issues. In particular issues like employment, health and housing came to the fore and this manifested itself in a move away from Fianna Fáil and Fine Gael.

Regarding healthcare, international trends such as in the National Health Service of the United Kingdom and elsewhere in Europe were noticed by the Irish political system. The office of Minister for Health was created as a separate "Minister of the Government" by the 1946 Ministers and Secretaries (Amendment) Act; this act also created the Minister for Social Welfare. Problems such as high infant mortality rates led to an increase in support for health reform. The Fianna Fáil government published a much delayed White Paper in 1947. This paper was followed by the 1947 Health Act, in which the scheme was provided for in Part III of the act. President O'Kelly convened a meeting of the Council of State to consider whether Part III should be referred to the Supreme Court, but he decided against doing so. However, the 1948 general election resulted in the surprise fall of Fianna Fáil from government and instead the First Inter-Party Government would be left with the responsibility of implementing the scheme.

The scheme
In 1948 Dr. Noël Browne, a new T.D. for Clann na Poblachta, and a socialist, became Minister for Health in a coalition government. Browne was an admirer of Fianna Fáil's 1947 Health Act and intended to implement its provisions as part of a plan to reduce the alarmingly high rate of child mortality (especially from tuberculosis) in Ireland, modernise the Irish healthcare system and make it free and without means-testing for mothers and their children up to the age of 16. He was impressed with the National Health Service in the United Kingdom and successful medical procedural reforms in Denmark which reduced child mortality. He tackled the domestic health issues and was acclaimed for the results.

In July 1950, Browne's department formally submitted the scheme to the Irish Medical Association. The Association had originally opposed the 1947 bill, mentioning the "socialisation of medicine." In this opposition it was supported by at least one member of the coalition cabinet: Fine Gael T.D. Dr. Thomas F. O'Higgins, the Minister for Defence and a former member of the executive of the Irish Medical Association.

More important was the opposition of the Archbishop of Dublin, John Charles McQuaid, who summoned Browne to his palace and read out a letter to be sent to the Taoiseach, John A. Costello, penned by Dr. James Staunton, Bishop of Ferns, which included the words "...they [the Archbishops and bishops] feel bound by their office to consider whether the proposals are in accordance with Catholic moral teaching," and, "Doctors trained in institutions in which we have no confidence may be appointed as medical officers ... and may give gynaecological care not in accordance with Catholic principles". The letter stated that health provision and physical education for children were solely the "right" of parents and not the State's concern. Archbishop McQuaid was the chairman of some boards of directors of Dublin hospitals. He exercised considerable influence concerning medical appointments and control over the religious orders whose members made up much of the administrative and management staff in hospitals, sanatoria etc. Concerning the term "moral teaching" in the letter to the Taoiseach, Browne received supportive advice - in secret - from Francis Cremin, a Maynooth professor of theology and canon law.

Several bishops, McQuaid included, feared that the scheme could pave the way for abortion and birth control. Though some clergy might have been privately sympathetic to Browne and wished to reach an accommodation, what was viewed as Browne's tactless handling of the Catholic Church forced the moderates into silence, allowing the anti-Mother and Child Scheme members of the hierarchy under McQuaid to set the agenda.

Many in the Anglican Church of Ireland community also disagreed with the scheme. The Church of Ireland Gazette saw it as 'communist' interference in the family.

Numerous doctors disapproved of the scheme, some on principle, others because they feared a loss of income and a fear of becoming a kind of civil servant, referring to the plan as "socialised medicine". Browne refused to back down on the issue but received little support even from his cabinet colleagues, most of whom he had alienated on other matters, notably his failure to attend many cabinet meetings and the lack of support which he had shown them in other crises. Isolated in cabinet as a 'loner' who did not consult with his more experienced cabinet colleagues, he also faced the hostility of his own party leader, Seán MacBride, with whom he had also fallen out, as he had with most members of the Clann na Poblachta Parliamentary Party, who resented his appointment to cabinet over the heads of more senior colleagues, and who were also offended by his treatment of them.

In April 1951, MacBride demanded Browne's resignation as a minister. Browne duly submitted his resignation to the Taoiseach John A. Costello for submission to President O'Kelly. The resignation took effect from 11 April 1951. In his resignation statement, Browne told the House:

I had been led to believe that my insistence on the exclusion of a means test had the full support of my colleagues in the Government. I now know that it had not. Furthermore, the Hierarchy has informed the Government that they must regard the mother and child scheme proposed by me as opposed to Catholic social teaching. This decision I, as a Catholic, immediately accepted without hesitation.

During the subsequent Dáil debate on the resignation, Tánaiste and Labour Party leader William Norton claimed:

...if this matter had been handled with tact, with understanding and with forbearance by the Minister responsible, I believe we would not have had the situation which has been brought about to-day.

Browne explained his approach to the Dáil by saying:

I might say that my question to their Lordships was: Is this contrary to Catholic moral teaching? The reply, as you all know, was that it is contrary to Catholic social teaching. I was not aware — the Taoiseach can verify this — until I had asked each member of the Cabinet separately what he proposed to do, what he had been given to understand by Dr. McQuaid when that decision was taken. He then told us that that morning he had been informed by Dr. McQuaid that Catholic social teaching and Catholic moral teaching were one and the same thing.

Aftermath
The following month a general election was called and in June 1951 a new government was formed as a result.

A derivative of the scheme was implemented subsequently by the Fianna Fáil government which returned to power as a result of the general election. This achieved legislative effect in the 1953 Health Act; this and later legislation that created the Voluntary Health Insurance Board in 1957. Although a single-payer system emerged in Ireland, the 1957 Act ended immediate attempts to implement a National Health Service-style healthcare model. Thus the private and public systems existing side-by-side, later reinforced by the 1970 Health Act, which changed healthcare from the responsibility of the county to a smaller number of regional health boards. The transfer of responsibility from local authority to state led to the introduction of the Unmarried Mother's Allowance in 1973, the first direct State payment to assist an unmarried woman to rear her child in the community.

References

Sources

Citations

External links
 Mother and Child Scheme Controversy History Hub, University College Dublin
 1950s - Mother and Child Scheme Oireachtas Library & Research Service

Health in the Republic of Ireland
1951 in Irish politics
13th Dáil
Medical controversies in the Republic of Ireland
Catholic social teaching